Longfellow is a census-designated place located in Bratton Township, Mifflin County in the state of Pennsylvania, United States.  It is located along Pennsylvania Route 103 in southern Mifflin County.  As of the 2010 census, the population was 215 residents.

Demographics

References

Census-designated places in Mifflin County, Pennsylvania
Census-designated places in Pennsylvania